Piers Benedict Adam (born March 1964) is a British businessman, the owner of London nightclubs Mahiki, Whisky Mist and Tini, and the co-owner of Mayfair's The Punch Bowl with Guy Ritchie.

Early life 
Piers Adam was born in March 1964, and grew up in north London, the son of David Adam, a lawyer, and Shirley, an art teacher. He was educated at Highgate School and then Oxford Polytechnic, where he studied estate management, but failed.

Career 

In 2002, he went into partnership with restaurateur Marco Pierre White and fellow club owner Oscar Owide, and they combined Swallow Street's Stork Club and Crazy Horse into a new club called the Stork Rooms, but it closed six months later.

In 2014, Adam purchased the Craigellachie Hotel in the Moray village of Craigellachie.

In 2019, he launched his own Scotch whisky called Copper Dog.

Personal life 
Adam was the best man at Guy Ritchie's wedding to Madonna at Skibo Castle in 2000.

Adam lives in Kensington with his wife, model Sophie Vanacore, and their two sons.

References 

1964 births
British businesspeople
Living people
People from Kensington
People educated at Highgate School
Place of birth missing (living people)
Date of birth missing (living people)